Ferdinand Dirichs (24 November 1894 – 27 December 1948) was a German Roman Catholic bishop.

Dirichs was born in Germany and was ordained to the priesthood in 1922. He served as bishop of the Roman Catholic Diocese of Limburg from 1947 until his death in 1948.

Notes

1894 births
1948 deaths
Roman Catholic bishops of Limburg
20th-century German Roman Catholic priests